Thérèse Vestris (1726–1808) was a French (originally Italian) ballerina.  She was engaged at the Paris Opera from 1751 and belonged to its elite dancers. She was the sister of Gaétan Vestris and Angiolo Vestris and was often paired with her brothers onstage.

References

18th-century French ballet dancers
1726 births
1808 deaths
Vestris family